Raphaël Gagné (born July 16, 1987) is a Canadian cross-country mountain biker.

Career 
Born in Quebec City, Quebec, Gagné won a gold medal at the 2015 Pan American Games. He also finished 6th at UCI-Mtb world cup XCO in Windham.  He finished 7th at the 2014 Commonwealth Games. In 2016, he was named to Canada's Olympic team.

2018 
Gagné joins European based UCI World cup team, Silverback OMX Pro Team with the goal of working towards Tokyo 2020 Olympic Games.

References

External links
 Official website

1987 births
Commonwealth Games competitors for Canada
Cyclists at the 2014 Commonwealth Games
Cyclists at the 2015 Pan American Games
French Quebecers
Living people
Pan American Games gold medalists for Canada
Cyclists from Quebec City
Canadian mountain bikers
Olympic cyclists of Canada
Cyclists at the 2016 Summer Olympics
Pan American Games medalists in cycling
Medalists at the 2015 Pan American Games